In enzymology, a CoB—CoM heterodisulfide reductase is an enzyme that catalyzes the chemical reaction

coenzyme B + coenzyme M + methanophenazine  N-{7-[(2-sulfoethyl)dithio]heptanoyl}-O3-phospho-L-threonine + dihydromethanophenazine

The 3 substrates of this enzyme are coenzyme B, coenzyme M, and methanophenazine, whereas its two products are [[N-{7-[(2-sulfoethyl)dithio]heptanoyl}-O3-phospho-L-threonine]] and dihydromethanophenazine.

This enzyme belongs to the family of oxidoreductases, specifically those acting on a sulfur group of donors with other, known, acceptors.  The systematic name of this enzyme class is coenzyme B:coenzyme M:methanophenazine oxidoreductase. Other names in common use include heterodisulfide reductase, and soluble heterodisulfide reductase.  This enzyme participates in folate biosynthesis.

References

 
 
 
 

EC 1.8.98
Enzymes of unknown structure